The Harding Home is a historic house museum at 380 Mount Vernon Avenue in Marion, Ohio. It was the residence of Warren G. Harding, twenty-ninth president of the United States. Harding and his future wife, Florence, designed the Queen Anne Style house in 1890, a year before their marriage. They were married there and lived there for 30 years before his election to the presidency.

Like James A. Garfield, an earlier U.S. president from Ohio, Harding conducted his election campaign mainly from the house's expansive front porch. During the 3 month front porch campaign, over 600,000 people traveled to the Harding Home to listen to Warren speak. George Christian (Warren's next door neighbor and Press Secretary) allowed his home to be used as Republican Headquarters for the campaign. In 1920, Harding built a small bungalow-style structure behind the Christian House so newspaper reporters had workspace to type their stories.

The house is surrounded by an expansive, elaborately detailed porch. Entry to the house is through a reception hall, with a parlor on the left. A dining room and Harding's office are also in the first floor. There are four bedrooms on the second floor and a bathroom. Built-in closets are an unusual feature for the time.

Mrs. Harding bequeathed the house to the Harding Memorial Association.  The Ohio Historical Society now operates the home as a historic house museum and a memorial.  The restored house contains almost all original furnishings owned by President Harding and his wife.  The adjacent press house features exhibits about the lives of President and Mrs. Harding. The collection at the Harding Home is over 5,000 original artifacts that belonged to Warren and Florence Harding.

On April 12, 2016, "Harding 2020", a collaboration between Ohio History Connection, the Harding Home, and Marion Technical College, detailed plans to spend $7.3 million at the site to establish the Warren G. Harding Presidential Center. Plans include restoring the home (inside and out) and its grounds to its 1920 appearance. The culmination of the work was to coincide with the 100th anniversary of Harding's election to the presidency.

See also
List of National Historic Landmarks in Ohio
 List of residences of presidents of the United States
Presidential memorials in the United States

References

External links
 
Harding Home website
Harding Home - Ohio Historical Society
National Park Service site on the Harding Home
Ohio Historic Society website on Harding Home
"Life Portrait of Warren G. Harding", from C-SPAN's American Presidents: Life Portraits, broadcast from the Harding Home, September 20, 1999

Warren G. Harding
National Historic Landmarks in Ohio
Houses on the National Register of Historic Places in Ohio
Museums in Marion County, Ohio
National Register of Historic Places in Marion County, Ohio
Houses completed in 1891
Historic house museums in Ohio
Presidential homes in the United States
Queen Anne architecture in Ohio
Ohio History Connection
Presidential museums in Ohio
Houses in Marion County, Ohio
Buildings and structures in Marion, Ohio
Tourist attractions in Marion County, Ohio